The 2014 FIBA European Championship for Small Countries is the 14th edition of the tournament, formerly known as the Promotion Cup or the FIBA EuroBasket Division C. It was played in the Tercentenary Sports Centre, Gibraltar, from July 7 to July 12, 2014.

The draw took place on 1 December 2013, in Freising, Germany. The Championship was won by title defenders, the Andorra national team.

First round

Group A

Group B

Knockout stage

Quarterfinals

Semifinals

5th–6th place game

3rd–4th place game

Final

References

External links 
 FIBA Europe website of the European Championship for Small Countries

2014
2014–15 in European basketball
2014 in Gibraltarian sport
International basketball competitions hosted by Gibraltar